Teaware is a broad international spectrum of equipment used in the brewing and consumption of tea. Many components make up that spectrum, and vary greatly based upon the type of tea being prepared, and the cultural setting in which it is being prepared. This is often referred to as the tea ceremony, and holds much significance in many cultures, particularly in northwestern Europe and in eastern Asia. A complete, cohesive collection of tea ware makes up a tea set.

Components

Alternatives / Others 

 Mug, instead of tea cup
Coffee cup, instead of tea cup
Chawan, tea bowl from East Asia
Chaki, the caddy for matcha
Japanese tea utensils, used in their tea ceremonies
Tea draining tray, for the Gongfu tea ceremony

Construction
Tea equipment may be constructed of many materials, from iron in Japan to porcelain and clay in China, and also bamboo and other woods. Of particular repute are the Yixing clay teapots produced in eastern China, a type of Yixing ware. The Brown Betty was original made from red clay found in Britain.

Lu Yu's tea set (陸羽的茶具)

Crushing block (砧椎)
Brazier (風爐)
Charcoal basket (炭筥)
Charcoal mallet (炭檛)
Fire chopsticks (火筴)
Cauldron (鍑)
Cauldron stand (交床)
Tea tongs (夾)
Paper wallet (紙囊)
Crushing roller (碾)
Sieve box (羅合)
Tea holder (則)
Water vessel (水方)
Water filter bag (漉水囊)
Gourd scooper (瓢)
Bamboo tongs (竹夾)
Salt container (鹺簋)
Boiled water vessel (熟盂)
Bowl (碗)
Bowl basket (畚)
Brush (劄)
Water basin (滌方)
Spent tea basin (滓方)
Tea cloth (巾)
Utensil table (具列)
Utensil basket (都籃)

The twelve tea pieces for the elderly (審安老人的12茶具)

Brazier (風爐)
Crushing block (砧椎)
Crushing roller (碾)
Stone mill (石磨)
Gourd scooper (瓢)
Sieve box (羅合)
Brush (札)
Bowl basket (畚)
Bowl (碗)
Water vessel (水方)
Tea whisk (茶筅)
Tea cloth (巾)

The above tea pieces were also mentioned by Lu Yu in The Classic of Tea, except for the stone mill (石磨) and tea whisk (茶筅).

See also
Flagstaff House Museum of Teaware
 List of Japanese tea ceremony equipment

 
Tea